The Life and Times of Juniper Lee (also known simply as Juniper Lee or Witch Girl Juniper Lee) is an American animated television series created by former MTV reality star Judd Winick for Cartoon Network and produced by Cartoon Network Studios. It premiered on May 30, 2005 on Cartoon Network and was cancelled on December 15, 2006. The show currently reruns on Pogo in India, Boing in Nigeria, South Africa and France, Boomerang in Thailand and Tooncast in Latin America.

On April 11, 2017, it was added to Boomerang's streaming app in the United States, making it one of the app's few shows that were never aired on the actual Boomerang channel in the US. While it was only broadcast in full screen 4:3, Juniper Lee is the first Cartoon Network original series to be produced in a widescreen aspect ratio of 16:9 in High Definition.

Premise
The series centers on the life of a preteen girl named Juniper Lee, who lives in Orchid Bay City. Based on Winick's adopted hometown of San Francisco, California, the city is a hub for magical activity and is filled with various monsters and demons, both good and evil. The magic and human worlds have been separated by an invisible mystical shield, known as "the Veil," which prevents ordinary humans from seeing any magic-related events or the creatures related to them. Juniper has recently been made the new Te Xuan Ze, the protector of the balance between the human and magical worlds.

To accomplish her task, she has been magically enhanced, making her far much stronger and faster than ordinary humans; superhuman strength, superhuman speed, superhuman reflexes and superhuman agility. She can also use various kinds of spells to assist her. Maintaining the balance often interferes with her personal life, including her schoolwork and her social life, but she always manages to keep everything flowing.

Inspiration
Winick has stated that Juniper Lee was inspired by both The Simpsons and Buffy the Vampire Slayer. However, Juniper does follow in the footsteps of Buffy, as stated in the quote below:

Characters

Main characters
 Juniper "June" Kim Lee (voiced by Lara Jill Miller) is the protagonist of the series. Juniper is a feisty 11-year-old Chinese-American human girl who lives in Orchid Bay City, and is the current Te Xuan Ze. Juniper is relatively uneducated in the world of magic, mostly relying on brute force, a real talent for insults, and the advice of her paternal grandmother, Ah-Mah, and her enchanted dog, Monroe, to defeat her foes. She has long black hair, and after she inherits the powers of the Te Xuan Ze, a lock of hair on the left side changes to white from root to end (Juniper's grandmother Jasmine, the former Te Xuan Ze, has the same stripe in her hair) and Juniper later dyes this reddish-pink. The juniper flower symbolizes protection, referring to Juniper's role as the Te Xuan Ze, protecting others. She wishes to go to astronaut camp, but cannot because she can't leave Orchid Bay City while she is the Te Xuan Ze until another member of her family is chosen. She's also hoping for a breathtaking romance with her close friend Marcus Conner.
 Jasmine Lee (voiced by Amy Hill) - Jasmine Lee or "Ah-Mah" as Juniper calls her, is Juniper's paternal grandmother, and the previous Te Xuan Ze. Many in the magical world consider her to be the greatest Te Xuan Ze ever. Calm and deliberate in most respects but crude and tough when she needs to be, the 69-year-old gives June advice on dealing with the magical community and their expectations of her, and assists her when she is in serious trouble. As of the "Monster Con" episode, Ah-Mah was shown to still possess a significant amount of magically-enhanced speed and strength, though her stamina and durability are severely diminished (in comparison to her granddaughter who has superhuman strength) to the point of being unable to stand unassisted after two to three minutes of combat (this is because of her old age). This supports her assertion in the first episode - that it was no longer her place to act as Te Xuan Ze - and is pragmatic, in the sense that it prevents June from shirking her responsibilities. In "Little Big Mah", she claims that she knows about 26 different styles of hand-to-hand combat, and that she hasn't been to China for 40 years (as Roxanne: "I haven't been to China in 40 years! Uh, I mean weeks. For weeks."). Younger Jasmine is depicted with a purple streak in her hair, instead of the usual magenta Te Xuan Ze streak.
 Ray Ray Lee (voiced by Kath Soucie) - Ray Ray Lee is Juniper's hyperactive, dimwitted 8-year-old little brother. Like Juniper, Ray Ray can see through the magic barrier, though this is not a naturally occurring ability. In the episodes after "Star Quality", he is occasionally seen watching monster TV. When Juniper first gained her powers, a group of demons attempted to drain her powers. Ray Ray unwittingly intervened, causing some of her powers to transfer to him, as seen in "Adventures in Babysitting". Whether or not he'll gain other powers similar to hers remains to be seen, as Ah-Mah has implied that he may over time. He is hyperactive and careless, and often gets himself into trouble when dealing with the magic world. Ray Ray is often over-eager in regards to the magic world, finding every single event involving it, no matter how bad or ominous, to be "cooool." A recurring joke about him is that asks if he has ever run out of energy, where someone would say, "but there's always a first time." He also has a sibling rivalry relationship with Juniper, although it is often seen that he cares for her deeply. Since episode "Feets too big", he has a crush on Lila, the Sasquatch. In the episodes after "O Brother, What Art Thou?", Ray Ray is a homunculus, his mind having been transferred to an artificial body after accidentally mutating his original body into a massive dinosaur by ingesting the growth potion that was supposed to make a giant grow back to his proper size. In "Meet the Parent", Monroe states that Ray Ray has a bladder control problem, though this has never been confirmed, save in "The World According to LARP" when Juniper said that he wet his pants on the jungle gym once, and again in "Dream Date" where he has trouble making it to the bathroom after drinking punch. Since he is very young still, it is probable he will outgrow these tendencies. In "Te Xuan Me", where after Juniper was erased from knowledge he took up being the Te Xuan Ze, and being particularly skilled at his position, even earning Monroe's praise. However, after everything was set back to normal, Ray Ray started to study in magic spells as a way to help his sister in future battles.
 Monroe Connery Boyd Carlyle McGregor Scott V (Monroe for short, voiced by Carlos Alazraqui) - Monroe is an enchanted pug of Scottish origin. He is quite educated in the world of magic, having been alive for several centuries and assisting each Te Xuan Ze for nearly that entire time. Despite his knowledge, Juniper Lee makes him his pet dog, due to his lack of grasping hands or opposable thumbs (according to Ray Ray, he uses this as an excuse for everything). Monroe has been magically enhanced, allowing him to be understood by those who can see through the magic barrier. Anyone else listening to him will only hear barking. He is also lactose intolerant.
 Dennis Lee (voiced by Alexander Polinsky) - Dennis Lee is Juniper's grumpy, cynical 15-year-old elder brother who does not take June or Ray Ray seriously and usually calls them names. He loves manga and video games and does not like anyone touching his stuff. In "Not in my Backyard", it is revealed that Dennis never gives June a turn on his video games (he says if monkeys fly out of his butt, she will have a turn, which will never happen). Also, when he saw that Ray Ray got one of his comics books, he didn't like it at all. In "The World According to L.A.R.P.", he's been known to take stuff out of June's room, which annoys her. In "Sealed With a Fist", Dennis learns that his sister is the current Te Xuan Ze and has grown to trust June after they work together with Boomfist and the heroic team of H.A.T.E. (Heroes Against Terrible Evildoers) to defeat the villainous team of L.O.V.E. (League of Villainous Evildoers). After that, he starts helping Juniper and Ray Ray on occasion.
 Jody Irwin (voiced by Colleen O'Shaughnessey) - Jody Irwin is Juniper's best friend and usually the happiest of the group. She tries her best to cheer the group, even in the most ridiculous of ways. June tries her best not to disappoint Jody, but, being Te Xuan Ze, she ends up doing so but Jody forgives her.
 Ophelia Ramírez (voiced by Candi Milo) - Ophelia Ramírez is one of Juniper's friends. She is a gothic, grumpy, cynical emo  girl with pinkish-purple colored hair and Latino descendancy. She doesn't like a lot of stuff (including girly things) and especially hates Roger (in fact, at some nights, Ophelia has nightmares about her dating Roger). When she is in charge, she wants everything done perfectly and usually has Roger doing something ridiculous.
 Roger Radcliffe (voiced by Tara Strong) - Roger Radcliffe is one of Juniper's friends and the school's clown, he has unpredictable tendencies, and he constantly asks Ophelia to go on a date, which she refuses. He's been known to imitate really famous people or songs in the most crude and ridiculous of ways, as in "Enter Sandman" when he was doing arm farts to New World Symphony No. 9, and in "It's the Great Pumpkin, Juniper Lee" where he was dressed up as a combination of a werewolf, a robot, and Abraham Lincoln. His family is eventually revealed to be wealthy, but he has never even come close to becoming spoiled due to his cheerful personality.

Supporting characters
 Marcus Conner (voiced by Phil LaMarr) - Along with being handsome and popular, Marcus Conner is one cool African-American boy. Juniper has a big crush on him, although she won't admit it. Despite being part of the in-crowd, Marcus is friends with everyone and often looks out for Juniper. He never gets caught up in his popularity and is always laid-back. As we see in "Enter Sandman", it was Juniper's dream to marry Marcus, after getting advice from Ah-Mah saying she had to fall asleep in order to go into the dream realm without being a visitor. His last name is first mentioned in "Meet the Parent".
 Michael and Barbara Lee (voiced by Carlos Alazraqui and Candi Milo) - Michael Lee and his wife Barbara are the parents of Juniper, Ray Ray, and Dennis. Michael is Jasmine's only child, and was supposed to wind up being the Te Xuan Ze after Ah-Mah; however, the trait skipped him and ended up with Juniper instead. Michael works with Mr. Radcliffe; his occupation is unknown. His wife, Barbara is a kind and caring mother. She will not, however, tolerate academic problems. Like her husband, she can't see magic or enchanted beings. She loves her children and will discipline them occasionally. One example is in "Monster in My Backyard" when she said: Oh and if Ray Ray blows up another potato in the microwave, he's grounded until he's 30.
 Ms. Jill Gomez (voiced by Candi Milo) - Ms. Gomez is a Mexican-American teacher at Juniper's school. While it's never shown, Ray Ray mentions in the episode "The World According to L.A.R.P." that he once accidentally turned her into a rhinoceros; he still thinks she was happier that way.
 William (voiced by Martin Jarvis) - William is Monroe's father, who previously served as the assistant to the Te Xuan Ze, and constantly teases Monroe about his weight. Although being a dog, he has a short beard. He seems more proud of his Scottish ancestry than Monroe, as he is seen wearing a kilt and tam o'shanter.
 Melissa O'Malley (voiced by Tara Strong) - Melissa O'Malley is Juniper's Irish-American school diva rival who is jealous of June because June has a boyfriend (Marcus) and she doesn't which is why she plans on breaking June and Marcus apart so that she can steal Marcus from June. She is accompanied by two girls who help her with her plans against June and her friends, the girls' names are unknown.
 Cletus and Gus (voiced by Jeff Bennett and Dee Bradley Baker) - Cletus and Gus are two recurring monsters, and friends of Juniper and Ray Ray.
 Lila (voiced by Tara Strong) - Lila is a Sasquatch. She is significantly smarter than other Sasquatch. She likes movies. Ray Ray is also seen to have a crush on her (even when she was hairy). In "Make Me Up Before You Go-Go", Lila claims herself to be an herbivore, although she was shown to have fangs when she got angry at Jody's sister Rachel. She helped June find her and Roger's parents (whom were captured by a lost Sasquatch named Charlie Paulsen) as well as helping her defeat a Brown Back Mountain Troll and returning a mountain lion's cubs to their mother. Later on, Monroe uses an Exfoliax Charm to remove most of her excess hair so that she could pass for human. She enrolls at Juniper's school to learn more about humans. She has super strength, reflexes on a par with Juniper's, and knows a ton about surviving and grooming skills in the woods. As a cover-up to Juniper's friends, Lila claims that her parents were forest rangers. For some reason, she is completely absent after "Make Me Up Before You Go-Go" only to return in the final episode. She may be based on Roxie, another Sasquatch disguised as a human from Judd Winick's comic book series Adventures of Barry Ween, Boy Genius; this along with many similar incidences between the two when trying to adapt to human life, most noticeably trying to carry a mountain of books in their bag.

Episodes

Reception

Critical reception 
The Life and Times of Juniper Lee debuted on Cartoon Network on May 30, 2005 at 7:00 PM ET/PT.

Awards and nominations

Comics
Stories based on the series were featured in issues of Cartoon Network Action Pack.

References

External links

 

2005 American television series debuts
2006 American television series endings
2000s American animated television series
American children's animated action television series
American children's animated adventure television series
American children's animated horror television series
American children's animated supernatural television series
American children's animated comic science fiction television series
American children's animated science fantasy television series
Animated television series about children
Anime-influenced Western animated television series
Chinese American television
Cartoon Network original programming
Television series by Cartoon Network Studios
Chinese mythology in popular culture
Elementary school television series
English-language television shows
Martial arts television series
Magical girl television series